Lisa Marr is a musician, songwriter, film-maker, photographer, and educator from Vernon, British Columbia, Canada, currently based in Los Angeles, California, and Vancouver, British Columbia, Canada. She has performed as a solo artist and as a member of The Evaporators, The Indecisives, The Bombshells, Cub, Buck, The Beards, The Lisa Marr Experiment, The Here + Now, and Soda & His Million Piece Band. She is sometimes known as Miss Marr in her solo work. She has been credited as the originator of a subgenre of music known as cuddlecore.

Music
Lisa Marr's music performing career began when she was invited to play bass for The Evaporators by Nardwuar five days before a show. She taught herself to play bass in that time by listening to Ramones records. Nardwuar and Marr, as well as the founders of Mint Records, were associated through their work at CITR-FM, the University of British Columbia's student radio station. Lisa began working at the station with her own show focused on Amnesty International. As she met friends at the station, she began to be more focused on music.

cub
Marr is a founding member, primary song writer, lead singer, and bass player for indie-pop band cub. The term cuddlecore was coined to describe their music. Destroyer (band) guitar player Nicholas Bragg invented the term as a joke, and also produced the band's hot dog day EP. Band members have expressed mixed feelings about the label
, though it was included in the artwork of their second album. Neko Case first toured playing music with cub as the drummer after founding drummer Valeria quit the band. It was also Case's first time singing on stage. cub toured with They Might Be Giants, who later covered their song New York City.

Buck
Buck (sometimes stylized as BuCk or Bu¢K) was Lisa Marr and drummer/vocalist Lisa G's band following the break-up of cub. Marr continued to sing lead vocals and play bass. The two were joined by guitarist Pepper Berry, playing in his first band.

Other notable musical projects
The Beards was a rock supergroup in which Lisa Marr played bass and shared singing and songwriting duties with Kim Shattuck. The Muffs had headlined a show with cub opening. Soon, Marr married the bass-player from the Muffs, and later, Marr and Shattuck collaborated on The Beards. 
The Lisa Marr Experiment was a country rock band. Neko Case covered "In California", a song from their first album, 4 am.
In 2019, Marr released a four-track single with Vancouver band The Tranzmitors (featuring members of The Smugglers and New Town Animals) that include two cub songs – Magic 8 Ball and Pretty Pictures – along with a cover of the Fastbacks song, In the Summer.

Visual arts

Marr was a 2014 Visual Art Fellow for the California Community Foundation.

Marr has made films on her own and is currently the operations director and youth film coordinator, as well as director, at the Echo Park Film Center. Her first major film project was a documentary entitled Learning How to Fail, which was screened at the Darklight Film Festival. She is also one of the few modern filmmakers to shoot on 3mm film.

Solo exhibitions
 2013 Natural History, A Free School, Los Angeles, CA Echo Park Film Center Road Show, The Hanoi Bicycle Collective, Hanoi, Vietnam
 2012 The Sound We See: City Symphonies in the 21st Century, Directors Lounge, Berlin, Germany Imagined Cinemas, Blaak 10 Gallery, Rotterdam, Netherlands

Group exhibitions and community-based art
 2014 Films from Echo Park Film Center, Distrital, Mexico City, Mexico Burning Bungalows: Experimental Film and Animation from LA, National Tour, USA
 2011–2014 Out The Window, Freewaves/Public Matters/UCLA REMAP, Los Angeles, CA
 2014 The Sound We See: A Guwahati City Symphony, Desire Machine Collective, Guwahati, India
 2013 Likuvarnya, Museum of Tripolian Culture, Legedzine, Ukraine
 2013 The Sound We See: A Hanoi City Symphony, Doclab/Goethe Institute, Hanoi, Vietnam
 2012 The Sound We See: A Rotterdam City Symphony , WORM/Creating 010/RAIR/Piet Zwarte Institute/Willem de Kooning Academy, Rotterdam, Netherlands
 2010 The Candahar, Cultural Olympiad, Vancouver, Canada

Other fellowships, grants, and awards
 2014 Cultural Exchange International Fellowship, Department of Cultural Affairs, Los Angeles and British Council, UK
 2014 Open Electives Fellowship, National Institute of Design, Guwahati, India
 2013 Robert Rauschenberg Foundation, Artistic Innovation and Collaboration Grant
 2012 Research Fellowship, Willem de Kooning Academy, Rotterdam, Netherlands

See also
Music of Canada
Music of Vancouver
Canadian rock
List of Canadian musicians
List of bands from Canada
List of bands from British Columbia

References

External links 
 Echo Park Film Center
 Archived version of Lisa Marr's personal website
 Lisa Marr's Personal Art-focused website
 The Sound We See, A Global Collaborative Film Project

Living people
Canadian indie pop musicians
Canadian songwriters
Canadian women film producers
Year of birth missing (living people)
Film producers from British Columbia
People from Vernon, British Columbia